Afraid to Fight is a 1922 silent American drama film directed by William Worthington and written by Charles Sarver. The film stars Frank Mayo, Lillian Rich, Peggy Cartwright, Lydia Knott, W.S. McDunnough, and Tom McGuire. The film was released on July 24, 1922, by Universal Film Manufacturing Company.

Plot
As described in a film magazine, Tom Harper (Mayo) is a former American Expeditionary Forces soldier, handy with his fists, but suffering the effects of being gassed during World War I. His crippled little sister Sally (Cartwright), he learns, can be cured of her invalidism if placed in the care of a specialist. As Tom is out of a job, Sally prays that Congress will pass the law and send him his bonus. A fight manager picks Tom up and sends him to the mountains for a rest cure on the condition that he will fight the boxing champion when he is well. While there he finds himself in love with Harriet Monroe (Rich), but is forced to take a beating from a rival as he is under orders not to fight until he is pronounced well. When he recovers, he whips the champion, wins enough money to have his little sister Sally cured, and goes back to the mountains to hand a trimming to the rival who had previously humiliated him.

Cast           
Frank Mayo as Tom Harper
Lillian Rich as Harriet Monroe
Peggy Cartwright as Sally Harper
Lydia Knott as Mrs. Harper
W.S. McDunnough as Dr. Butler
Tom McGuire as 'Big Jim' Brandon
Harry Mann as Leonard
Wade Boteler as Phillip Brand
Al Kaufman as 'Slick' Morrisey
Roscoe Karns as Bertie
Guy Tiney as Fat Boy
Charles Haefeli as Johnny Regan
Tom Kennedy as Battling Grogan
James Quinn as Slim Dawson

References

External links

1922 films
1920s English-language films
Silent American drama films
1922 drama films
Universal Pictures films
Films directed by William Worthington
American silent feature films
American black-and-white films
1920s American films